Ortu Hassenbrook Academy is a coeducational secondary school located in Stanford-le-Hope, Essex, England.

History 
Originally established as Hassenbrook Secondary Modern School in 1952, it later became a comprehensive school administered by Thurrock Council. Arthur Thomas Bugler  was headteacher from the school opening until 1955. The school also gained specialist status as a Technology College. In September 2011 it converted to academy status and was renamed Hassenbrook Academy. In September 2016 the school became part of the Ortu Federation and was renamed Ortu Hassenbrook Academy. In March 2022 Sally Feeney became permanent headteacher, having served in the position "temporarily" for a year until she had gained the required qualifications.

The school offers GCSEs and BTECs as programmes of study for pupils. Although Ortu Hassenbrook Academy does not offer its own sixth form provision, the school has links to Ortu Sixth form operated by Ortu Gable Hall School.

Notable former pupils
Graham Bright, politician and Cambridgeshire Police and Crime Commissioner
Phill Jupitus, comedian
Mark Kaylor, boxer

References

External links
Ortu Hassenbrook Academy official website

Academies in Thurrock
Secondary schools in Thurrock
Educational institutions established in 1952
1952 establishments in England